Lord Henry Thomas Howard-Molyneux-Howard (7 October 1766 – 17 June 1824), known as Henry Howard until 1812, and as Henry Molyneux-Howard until 1817, was a British gentleman who served as Deputy Earl Marshal in the latter part of the reign of George III and early in the reign of George IV. On the inheritance of the Dukedom of Norfolk in 1815 by his elder brother Bernard, Henry Molyneux-Howard in 1817 was granted the courtesy title "Lord", the style of a younger son of a duke.

Origins
Howard was the son of Henry Howard (1713–1787) by his wife Juliana Molyneux, daughter of Sir William Molyneux, 6th Baronet (died 1781), of Teversall, Nottinghamshire, High Sheriff of Nottinghamshire 1737. His father, Henry Howard, was a descendant of Bernard Howard (1641–1714), a younger son of Henry Howard, 22nd Earl of Arundel (1608–1652) and younger brother of Thomas Howard, 5th Duke of Norfolk (1627–1677) and Henry Howard, 6th Duke of Norfolk (1628-1684).

Career
On 24 May 1790 Howard was commissioned a captain in the North Battalion, Gloucestershire Militia. He first entered Parliament the same year, being returned for Arundel in Sussex, under the patronage of the Duke of Norfolk of Arundel Castle, and Steyning. His election for Steyning was overturned on petition in 1791, but he represented Arundel until 1795. He was then elected for Gloucester, which seat he held until 1818.

In 1812 on the death of his uncle Sir Francis Molyneux, 7th Baronet, Howard inherited the Molyneux estates of Teversal and Wellow, and under the terms of the bequest adopted the surname Molyneux-Howard. In 1814, he also purchased Aldingbourne House, formerly the seat of Lady Molyneux-Howard, and made some alterations to expand it. In 1815 his elder brother Bernard Howard succeeded a distant cousin as 12th Duke of Norfolk. Because Bernard was a Roman Catholic recusant, he was obliged to appoint a deputy to carry out his duties as Earl Marshal, and chose for this post his brother Henry, who was officially appointed to the post in March 1816.

On 14 October 1817 Molyneux-Howard resumed the use of Howard as his principal surname, becoming Henry Thomas Howard-Molyneux-Howard, and on the following day was granted a warrant of precedence to be styled as a younger son of a duke, and having thus gained the courtesy title "Lord", became known as Lord Henry Thomas Howard-Molyneux-Howard. He carried out his duties as Deputy Earl Marshal during the planning for the coronation of King George IV (1820–1830), but was unable by reason of illness to act at the actual event, at which his role was taken by his kinsman Lord Howard of Effingham. He was again returned to Parliament for Arundel from 1818 until 1820, in which latter year he was returned for Steyning, which seat he held until his death in 1824.

Marriage and children
On 12 September 1801 Howard-Molyneux-Howard married Elizabeth Long, daughter of Edward Long (1734-1813), a British colonial administrator, historian and author of The History of Jamaica, by whom he had one son and four daughters:
Henry Howard (25 July 1802 – 7 January 1875).
 Henrietta Anna Molyneux-Howard (17 July 1804 – 26 May 1876), wife of Henry Herbert, 3rd Earl of Carnarvon and had issue.
Isabella Catherine Mary Howard (29 September 1806 – 20 June 1891), wife of Charles Howard, 17th Earl of Suffolk and had issue.
Charlotte Juliana Jane Howard (February 1809 – 15 December 1855), wife of James Wentworth Buller and mother of General Sir Redvers Henry Buller (1839–1908), V.C.
Juliana Barbara Howard (31 March 1812 – 27 December 1833), wife of Sir John Ogilvy, 9th Baronet and had issue.

Death and succession
Howard-Molyneux-Howard died aged 57 in June 1824 after a short illness in his house in Lower Grosvenor Street, Mayfair. His eldest son Henry Howard replaced him in Parliament. The Teversall and Wellow estates, which had been entailed on his second son or eldest daughter, descended to his daughter  Henrietta Anna Howard, later Countess of Carnarvon, who adopted the surname of Molyneux-Howard in consequence.

References

External links 
 

1766 births
1824 deaths
Howard, Henry Thomas
Howard, Henry Thomas
Henry Thomas Howard-Molyneux-Howard
Howard, Henry Thomas
Howard, Henry Thomas
Howard, Henry Thomas
Howard, Henry Thomas
Molyneux-Howard, Henry Thomas
UK MPs 1812–1818
UK MPs 1820–1826
Whig (British political party) MPs for English constituencies
Members of the Parliament of the United Kingdom for English constituencies
UK MPs 1818–1820
Members of Parliament for Gloucester